Keith Patterson (born May 20, 1964) is an American football coach. He is the head football coach at Abilene Christian University. Prior to that he was the defensive coordinator at Texas Tech University; while there, Patterson served as the team's head coach for a win against Kansas in 2020. Patterson was previously the defensive coordinator at Arizona State University for four years. Patterson was also the defensive coordinator and linebackers coach for the West Virginia Mountaineers. Before one season at West Virginia, Patterson was the defensive coordinator for the Arkansas State Red Wolves on January 4, 2012, only to resign from the position six weeks later to join the West Virginia coaching staff. Prior to his arrival at Arkansas State, Patterson was elevated from defensive coordinator to interim head coach following the resignation of Todd Graham on December 13, 2011, at Pittsburgh.

Abilene Christian 
On December 6, 2021, Footballscoop.com reported that Patterson would get his first opportunity as a full time head coach at Abilene Christian University, replacing Adam Dorrel.

Head coaching record

College

References

External links
 Texas Tech profile
 Arizona State profile

1964 births
Living people
American football defensive backs
Abilene Christian Wildcats football coaches
Arkansas State Red Wolves football coaches
East Central Tigers football players
East Central Tigers football coaches
Pittsburgh Panthers football coaches
Tulsa Golden Hurricane football coaches
West Virginia Mountaineers football coaches
High school football coaches in Oklahoma
High school football coaches in Texas
People from Marlow, Oklahoma